Past Present is an album by jazz guitarist John Scofield that was recorded in March and released in September of 2015. Scofield is joined by saxophonist Joe Lovano, bassist Larry Grenadier and drummer Bill Stewart. This album reunited Scofield with Lovano and Stewart, who had been members of his quartet on Meant to Be (1991) and What We Do (1993). Lovano had also appeared on Time on My Hands (1990) and Oh! (under the group name “ScoLoHoFo”).

The album earned Scofield a Grammy Award for Best Jazz Instrumental Album. The title track was nominated for Best Improvised Jazz Solo Grammy.

Track listing
 "Slinky" - 7:09	
 "Chap Dance" - 5:20	
 "Hangover" - 6:34	
 "Museum" - 6:30	
 "Season Creep" - 5:03	
 "Get Proud" - 5:21	
 "Enjoy the Future!" - 5:23	
 "Mr. Puffy" - 5:01	
 "Past Present" - 6:02

Personnel
John Scofield – guitar
Joe Lovano – tenor saxophone
Larry Grenadier – double bass
Bill Stewart – drums

References

2015 albums
Instrumental albums
John Scofield albums